The St. George Marathon is an annual marathon sporting event hosted by the city of St. George, Utah on the first Saturday in October. The first race run was in November 1977. It was originated and organized in just a few months by Sherm Miller, who worked for the Parks and Recreation Department of St. George City. It is currently the 13th largest marathon in the United States of America.

Race
The St. George Marathon accommodates up to 7,400 runners. All runners, male and female, from any nation, may submit registrations to run; but only 7,400 runners are selected by random lottery to participate. Runners must be able to complete the race within six hours.

The race begins at 6:40 AM for wheelchair participants, and at 6:45 AM for runners.

History
When Sherm Miller, who worked for the St. George City Parks and Recreation Department, returned to St. George after running the Deseret News Marathon in Salt Lake City, he was inspired to host a marathon in St. George. Although others were not as enthusiastic about the idea, he was allowed to hold his marathon. He quickly organized the first St. George Marathon, held in November 1977.

That first race began on a cold day with 57 runners and one wheelchair racer. The participants faced a strong headwind as they ran. Near mile 20, one runner was almost hit by a hay truck. Of the 58 who started the race, only 38 reached the finish line, a finish line on a course that was later discovered to be 40 yards too short.

The next year the number of participants grew to 378 just by word of mouth, drawn by the descriptions of the scenery of Southwestern Utah, including red and white sandstone formations in the Snow Canyon area just outside St. George, even though the race at that time was not yet a sanctioned marathon.

Since then, the St. George Marathon has grown steadily and has since become a USA Track and Field Certified and Sanctioned race.

In 2006, the 30th anniversary of the St. George Marathon, the race was limited to 6,700 participants, with applicants selected by random lottery, except for residents of Washington County, Utah and members of the St. George Marathon's 10-year and 20-year clubs who are officially entered into the race before the lottery. Also in 2006, the course was changed slightly in the last two miles for the run within the city, providing a route that is less congested with automobile traffic.

Debbie Zockoll, a first-grade teacher in the Washington County School District, was one of the 58 runners who competed in the first St. George Marathon in 1977. She became the first member of the 10-year club in 1987. She was also the first member of the 20-year club, and in 2006 she became the first member of the 30-year club. She became the first member of the 40-year club in 2016 and Zockoll would go on to run in the first 43 St. George Marathons before dying of cancer in March 2021.

Race times are used by many participants to qualify for the Boston Marathon.

Runner's World magazine has included the St. George Marathon in the Runner's World 10 Most Scenic Marathons, Fastest Marathons and the Top 20 Marathons in the USA; calling it one of four "marathons to build a vacation around."  Based on surveys of runners, Runner's World magazine named the St. George Marathon, the Most Organized Marathon. The race is known for tremendous volunteer support.

The St. George Marathon is currently part of the Utah Grand Slam.

The 2020 edition of the race was cancelled due to the coronavirus pandemic, with all registrants given the option of transferring their entry to 2021 or obtaining a full refund.

References

External links
 Official Web site of the St. George Marathon
 St. George Marathon Elevation Profile
 Information about The Mayor's Walk event

Marathons in the United States
Marathon
Recurring sporting events established in 1977
Sports competitions in Utah